Margaret Hill is a peak rising to  on Rucker Ridge,  east of Mount Rucker, in the Royal Society Range of Victoria Land, Antarctica. It was named after Margaret Clark, a geologist with the 1977–78 New Zealand Geological Survey field party in this area. The form of the name has been selected to avoid redundancy of the name "Clark" in the region.

References

Mountains of Victoria Land
Scott Coast